This is a list of electoral results for the electoral district of Carlton in Victorian state elections.

Members for Carlton

Election results

Elections in the 1950s

Elections in the 1940s

 Preferences were not distributed.

 Two party preferred vote was estimated.

Elections in the 1930s

 Two party preferred vote was estimated.

 Preferences were not distributed.

Elections in the 1920s

Elections in the 1910s

References

Victoria (Australia) state electoral results by district